Sturgis is a surname of Norman origin, shortened form of FitzTurgis "son of" (see Fitz) "Turgis" (former first name, now still common as a Norman surname, together with "Tourgis") from the Old Norse Þórgísl or Old Danish Thorgisl ( the name of the god Thor, and -gísl "hostage, pledge" or ON geisli "ray, pole (part of a weapon)" or OW. Norse geisl "staff", cf. Old Icelandic geisli "sun-shaft, sun beam"). It corresponds to the Nordic patronymic Þórgilsson (f. e. Ari Þorgilsson).

People with the name
 Amy H. Sturgis (born 1971), American author
 Ann Sturgis (born 1956), First Lady of North Carolina
 Caleb Sturgis (born 1989), American football player
 Ellen Sturgis Hooper (1812–1848), American Transcendentalist poet, daughter of William F. Sturgis
 Frank Sturgis (1924–1993), American covert operative and Watergate burglar
 Henry Parkman Sturgis (1847–1929), American-born  banker in the UK and UK politician
 Howard Sturgis (1855–1920), English-born author
 John Hubbard Sturgis (1834–1888), an American architect and son of the younger Russell Sturgis (1805–1887)
 John Sturgis, journalist on The Sun, one of those arrested in Operation Elveden in February 2012
 Julian Sturgis (1848–1904), American-British author
 Matthew Sturgis, British historian and biographer
 Nathan Sturgis (born 1987), American soccer player
 Richard Clipston Sturgis (1860–1951), AKA R. Clipston Sturgis, an American architect and nephew of John Hubbard Sturgis
 Russell Sturgis (1836–1909), an American architect
 Russell Sturgis (1750–1826), an American merchant and grandfather of the younger Russell Sturgis (1805–1887)
 Russell Sturgis (1805–1887), an American-English merchant and banker
 Samuel D. Sturgis (1822–1889), a Union general in the American Civil War
 Samuel D. Sturgis III (1897–1964), major general in the U.S. Army and grandson of Union general Samuel D. Sturgis
 William Codman Sturgis (1862–1942), American mycologist
 William F. Sturgis (1782–1863), American merchant
 William R. Sturgis (1817–1901), Canadian-American politician, farmer, and politician

See also
Sturgis (disambiguation)
Sturges
Turgis (disambiguation)

References

Surnames of Norman origin